George Bickersteth Hudson  (16 March 1845 – 29 February 1912) was a British Conservative politician and barrister who served as the Member of Parliament for Hitchin, Hertfordshire from 1892 to 1906.

Hudson was born at Frogmore Hall in Aston, Hertfordshire, the second son of Rev. Thomas Dawson Hudson and his wife, Isabella Mary Bennett.

He was educated at Rugby School and Exeter College, Oxford. He was called to the bar by the Inner Temple in 1872.

References 

1845 births
1912 deaths
English barristers
UK MPs 1892–1895
UK MPs 1895–1900
UK MPs 1900–1906
Conservative Party (UK) MPs for English constituencies
People from Hitchin
People from Hertfordshire (before 1965)
Members of the Inner Temple
Deputy Lieutenants of Hertfordshire
People educated at Rugby School
Alumni of Exeter College, Oxford
English justices of the peace